Otto IV, also known as Otto Crookleg or Otto the Lame (d 1446) Duke of Brunswick-Lüneburg, was Prince of Lüneburg from 1434 to 1446.

Life 
After the death of his father, Bernard, he took over as ruler of the Principality of Lüneburg jointly with his brother, Frederick the Pious. Their rule was marked by major building work to Celle Castle and also by numerous reforms which improved the legal situation of farmers vis-a-vis their local lords.

Marriage 
In 1425 Otto IV married Elisabeth of Eberstein (before 1415–1468) and had a daughter by her.

Ancestors

Literature 
 Geckler, Christa (1986). Die Celler Herzöge: Leben und Wirken 1371–1705. Celle: Georg Ströher. . .

External links 
 The Welfs

Princes of Lüneburg
1446 deaths
Year of birth unknown
Middle House of Lüneburg
Royalty and nobility with disabilities